Sirup is a 1990 Danish drama film written and directed by Helle Ryslinge. It was entered into the main competition at the 47th Venice International Film Festival.

Plot
Lasse Jager, a salesman at a Danish convenience store, decides to move to the fictional village of Raker, Minnesota, home to a large Danish diaspora. Lasse meets and marries an American woman, and returns with her to Denmark. However, unbeknownst to him, they are filming a sitcom called "Sirup" in the convenience store he works at, which parodies the store's workers - including him. Lasse must decide if he wants to star in the sitcom as an actor, or take it to the police, while also having to deal with a man who is a regular at the store, but later finds out that he is a rapist who escaped from prison.

Cast 
Peter Hesse Overgaard as Lasse
Kirsten Lehfeldt as Ditte
Steen Svare as Jesper
Henrik Scheele as Terje
Pernille Højmark as Pia
Aage Haugland as 	Goldbauer
Søren Østergaard as Hr. Finth

References

External links

1990 films
Danish drama films 
1990 drama films
Films set in Denmark
 Films set in Minnesota